Cleonymia is a genus of moths of the family Noctuidae.

Species
 Cleonymia affinis (Rothschild, 1920)
 Cleonymia baetica (Rambur, 1837)
 Cleonymia chabordis (Oberthür, 1876)
 Cleonymia diffluens (Staudinger, 1870)
 Cleonymia fatima (A. Bang-Haas, 1907)
 Cleonymia jubata (Oberthür, 1890)
 Cleonymia korbi (Staudinger, 1895)
 Cleonymia marocana (Staudinger, 1901)
 Cleonymia opposita (Lederer, 1870)
 Cleonymia pectinicornis (Staudinger, 1859)
 Cleonymia vaulogeri (Staudinger, 1899)
 Cleonymia versicolor (Rothschild, 1920)
 Cleonymia warionis (Oberthür, 1876)
 Cleonymia yvanii (Duponchel, 1833)

References
 Cleonymia at Markku Savela's Lepidoptera and Some Other Life Forms
 Natural History Museum Lepidoptera genus database
 

Cuculliinae